Korucu is a village in the Cizre District of Şırnak Province in Turkey. The village is populated by Kurds of the Elîkan and Meman tribes and had a population of 1,243 in 2021.

The hamlet of Karatepe is attached to Korucu.

References 

Villages in Cizre District
Kurdish settlements in Şırnak Province